Owen Lun West Smith (May 18, 1851 – January 5, 1926) was an African American minister and diplomat of the United States.

Biography 
Smith was born into slavery in Giddensville, Sampson County, North Carolina on May 18, 1851. At the start of the Civil War, he would follow the Confederate army while serving as a personal servant. Later on, however, he would enlist in the Union Army and go on to fight in the Battle of Bentonville.

After becoming a freedman, Smith worked as a teacher before getting a scholarship to attend the University of South Carolina from 1874 to 1876.

In 1880 Smith would convert to the African Methodist Episcopal Zion Church, while attending a camp in Whiteville, North Carolina; later on, by 1881, he would attain a preacher's license and was ordained as a local deacon. Following his conversion, he would go on to receive an honorary Doctor of Divinity degree from Livingstone College in 1883.

After having been appointed on February 11, 1898, Smith would go on to serve as the Minister Resident of the United States to Liberia between May 11, 1898, and May 13, 1902.

Smith died on January 5, 1926, in Wilson, North Carolina, where he was later buried.

References 

1851 births
1926 deaths
American freedmen
People from Sampson County, North Carolina
Religious leaders from North Carolina
Union Army soldiers
African-American schoolteachers
University of South Carolina alumni
African Methodist Episcopal Zion Church clergy
Deacons
Livingstone College alumni
African-American diplomats
Ambassadors of the United States to Liberia
20th-century African-American people
19th-century American diplomats
20th-century American diplomats